Filippo Veglio (born 21 March 1974) is a former professional tennis player from Switzerland.

Career 
Veglio played his first and only Grand Slam in 1996, at the US Open, as a qualifier in the Men's Singles. He upset world number 57 Christian Ruud in the opening round and took the first set off Àlex Corretja, but lost in four.

He was however most successful as a doubles player. In 1998 he teamed up with Barry Cowan at Chennai and the pair reached the semi-finals, where they were defeated by Mahesh Bhupathi and Leander Paes. His only other semi-final appearance on tour came at the 1999 Copenhagen Open, with Michael Kohlmann as his partner.

Challenger titles

Doubles: (3)

References

External links
 

1974 births
Living people
Swiss male tennis players